

Lady of Modena

House of Este, 1288–1452

Duchess of Modena

House of Este, 1452–1796

House of Austria-Este, 1814–1859

Nominal Duchess of Modena

House of Este, 1796–1806

House of Austria-Este, 1806–1814

House of Austria-Este, since 1859

Notes

References

 
House of Este
Austria-Este
Modenese, consorts